Hamburg-Altona is an electoral constituency (German: Wahlkreis) represented in the Bundestag. It elects one member via first-past-the-post voting. Under the current constituency numbering system, it is designated as constituency 19. It is located in western Hamburg, comprising the Altona borough.

Hamburg-Altona was created for the inaugural 1949 federal election. Since 2021, it has been represented by Linda Heitmann of the Alliance 90/The Greens.

Geography 
Hamburg-Altona is located in western Hamburg. As of the 2021 federal election, it is coterminous with the borough of Altona.

History 
Hamburg-Altona was created in 1949, then known as Hamburg II. From 1965 to 1980, it was simply named Altona. It acquired its current name in the 1980 election. In the inaugural Bundestag election, it was constituency 7 in the numbering system. From 1953 through 1961, it was number 16. From 1965 through 1998, it was number 13. From 2002 through 2009, it was number 20. Since 2013, it has been constituency 19.

Originally, it comprised the entirety of the Altona borough with the exception of the quarters of Altona-Altstadt and the Ortsteil of Altona-Nord/Süd from Altona-Nord. From 1965, it gained the Ortsteil of Altona-Altstadt/Nord, but lost the remainder of Altona-Nord. Since the 1980 election, it has been coterminous with the Altona borough, with a brief exception from 2009–2013 when the newly-created quarter of Sternschanze, administratively part of the Altona borough, remained within the Hamburg Mitte constituency; it was transferred to Hamburg-Altona in the 2013 election.

Members 
The constituency has been held by the Social Democratic Party (SPD) during all but four Bundestag terms since 1949; it returned a representative from the SPD in every federal election from 1957 to 2021 with the exception of 1987. Its first representative was Hugo Scharnberg of the Christian Democratic Union (CDU), who served from 1949 to 1957. The SPD's Karl-Wilhelm Berkhan won the constituency in 1957 and served until 1976, when he was succeeded by Horst Gobrecht. The CDU held it for a single term in 1987 under representative Jürgen Echternach; it returned to the SPD's candidate Marliese Dobberthien in 1990. Future Federal Chancellor of Germany Olaf Scholz represented the constituency from 1998 to 2001, when he resigned to become Senator for the Interior of Hamburg. He was elected again in 2002 and was re-elected two times before resigned to take office as First Mayor of Hamburg. In the 2013 election, Matthias Bartke was elected as his successor. In 2021, the constituency was won Linda Heltmann by the Greens.

Election results

2021 election

2017 election

2013 election

2009 election

References 

Federal electoral districts in Hamburg
1949 establishments in West Germany
Constituencies established in 1949
Olaf Scholz